The GW Jeep Site is an archaeological site which spans the border between Pocahontas County, West Virginia, and Highland County, Virginia. The site is located in two national forests; the West Virginia portion is within the Monongahela National Forest, while the Virginia portion is within the George Washington National Forest. A Native American camp where stone tools were made was located at the site between 1,000 and 5,000 years ago. The site was named after a Jeep owned by the George Washington National Forest, which was in the area when forest employees first noted the site.

The site was added to the National Register of Historic Places on December 23, 1993.

References

Archaeological sites on the National Register of Historic Places in West Virginia
Archaeological sites on the National Register of Historic Places in Virginia
Geography of Highland County, Virginia
Geography of Pocahontas County, West Virginia
Monongahela National Forest
George Washington and Jefferson National Forests
National Register of Historic Places in Pocahontas County, West Virginia